Events from the year 1871 in Sweden

Incumbents
 Monarch – Charles XV

Events
 Poor Care Regulation of 1871 replace the Poor Care Regulation of 1847.
 July – Handelsbanken is established in Stockholm.
 Stockholm Central Station is inaugurated.
 Geologiska föreningen is founded.

Births
 7 February – Wilhelm Stenhammar, composer  (died 1927) 
 14 February - Gerda Lundequist, actress  (died 1959) 
 15 February – John W. Nordstrom, Swedish-born American co-founder of the Nordstrom department store chain (d. 1963)
 12 March – Oscar Hedström,  co-founder of the Indian Motocycle Manufacturing Company, makers of the Indian Motocycle  (died 1960)

Deaths
 25 February - Anna Sofia Sevelin, opera singer (born 1790)
 30 March - Louise of the Netherlands, queen consort (born 1828)
  - Anna Sundström, chemist (born 1785)
  - Emma Fürstenhoff, florist (born 1802)

References

 
Years of the 19th century in Sweden
Sweden